Najjanankumbi is located in Lubaga Division,  on the southern edge of the city of Kampala.

Location
Najjanankumbi is located on the southern edge of the city of Kampala.

It is bordered by Kibuye to the north, Lukuli to the east, Makindye to the southeast, Lubowa to the south, Kabowa to the west, and Ndeeba to the northwest.

Overview
Najjanankumbi is a residential and business location. Numerous shops, restaurants, bars, and small one to two roomed rental residencies are in Najjanankumbi. The Forum for Democratic Change, the main Ugandan opposition political party, maintains their headquarters at Najjanankumbi.

Points of interest
Some of the additional points of interest in Najjanankumbi include:
 Uganda Australia Christian Outreach - A non-governmental organization providing free healthcare to local residents
 The headquarters of the Uganda Local Governments Association

See also
 Kampala Capital City Authority
 Makindye Division
 Diamond Trust Bank (Uganda)

References

External links
Uganda: Lubaga Hospital Opens Outreach in Najjanankumbi

https://www.kcca.go.ug/uDocs/Rubaga-Grades.pdf

Cities in the Great Rift Valley
Wakiso District
Ssabagabo